Tlalchapa is one of the 81 municipalities of Guerrero, in south-western Mexico. The municipal seat lies at Tlalchapa.  The municipality covers an area of 414.3 km².

As of 2005, the municipality had a total population of 11,286.

Towns and villages
 

Otlatepec
San Miguel Tecomatlán

References

Municipalities of Guerrero